Gilbert's Pit is a  geological Site of Special Scientific Interest in Charlton in the Royal Borough of Greenwich. It was notified in 1985 and was formerly known as Charlton Sand Pit. It is a Geological Conservation Review site. It is also part of the Maryon Wilson Park and Gilbert's Pit Local Nature Reserve.  It adjoins Maryon Park and is close to Maryon Wilson Park.

History
There was a Romano-British settlement on Cox's Mount, the summit of Gilbert's Pit, between the first and fifth centuries. The area was part of the ancient Hanging Wood. The Pit was part of the estate of the Maryon-Wilson family. From the late eighteenth century to 1889 it was worked for sand, and it was named after one of the managers, Mr E. Gilbert. It was purchased by the London County Council in 1930.

Geology
Gilbert's Pit is an important Paleogene site, displaying one of the most complete sequences of sediments in Greater London. The Paleocene Thanet and Woolwich Formations date to around 55 million years ago. Some of the beds yield many fossils of plants, sponges, molluscs, fish and reptiles. The site has been studied for over 120 years and is the subject of a substantial literature.

Ecology
The site is steeply sided. The main trees are birch and oak, and there is yellow gorse and broom on the upper slopes. On the lower slopes hawthorn provides nesting sites for birds.

Access
Much of the site is fenced off. There is access to the part which is open from Charlton Lane and a path from the Gilbert's Pit information board in Maryon Park leads up to Cox's Mount, which has fine views over London.

See also
List of Sites of Special Scientific Interest in Greater London

References

External links 

Green Chain Walk, Geotrail

Sites of Special Scientific Interest in London
Parks and open spaces in the Royal Borough of Greenwich
Geology of London
Local nature reserves in Greater London
Charlton, London
Nature reserves in the Royal Borough of Greenwich